Empire Broadcasting Corporation was a local media and entertainment company.  Assets included four radio station frequencies in the Capital Region of New York.

Empire sold the last of its assets in October 2019.

Former Stations
 WABY 900 AM in Watervliet, New York.
 WSSV 1160 AM in Mechanicville, New York.
 W291BY 106.1 FM in Albany, New York.
 WPTR 1240 AM in Schenectady, New York.

References

External links 
Empire Radio Stations

Radio in New York City